James Patrick Nolan (December 1, 1897 – April 12, 1957) was a Canadian ice hockey player who played one season in the National Hockey League for the Toronto St. Patricks in 1922. Nolan was born in Glace Bay, Nova Scotia and he appeared in only two games during the 1921–22 season, on January 7, 1922 against the Hamilton Tigers, and January 14 against the Ottawa Senators. The rest of Nolan's career, which lasted from 1915 to 1931, was spent in various minor and amateur leagues.

Career statistics

Regular season and playoffs

References

External links
 

1897 births
1957 deaths
Canadian ice hockey left wingers
Ice hockey people from Nova Scotia
People from Glace Bay
Stanley Cup champions
Toronto St. Pats players